Arplast Helice  is a former French manufacturer of propellers for light aircraft and microlights.  The company was based at Gargas, France.  The company appears to have been wound up on 29 April 2015.  

The firm's main product was the composite 3-bladed "Ecoprop", which can be ground-adjustable, in-flight adjustable, or automatically folding. The Ecoprop modular propellers are lightweight, have a very slim profile and are very efficient. Also, the firm once produced its own microlight aircraft, the Arplast Micro'B.

See also
Le Dauphiné article -  http://www.ledauphine.com/economie-et-finance/2013/12/03/le-concepteur-d-helices-en-carbone-arplast-se-diversifie

References

Propellers